Robert Henry Graham (12 October 1900–1965) was an English footballer who played in the Football League for Ashington, Lincoln City and Middlesbrough.

References

1900 births
1965 deaths
English footballers
Association football midfielders
English Football League players
Middlesbrough F.C. players
Darlington F.C. players
Wrexham A.F.C. players
Halifax Town A.F.C. players
Workington A.F.C. players